Bessèges is a former railway station in Bessèges, Occitanie, France. The station is located on the Bessèges–Robiac railway. The station was served by TER (local) services to Alès operated by the SNCF. It was closed in 2012.

References

External links

Bessèges in 1991

Railway stations in France opened in 1857
Defunct railway stations in Gard